Xia Fujie (born 23 June 1970) is a Chinese former swimmer who competed in the 1988 Summer Olympics.

She now coaches the Albuquerque Dolphins.

References

1970 births
Living people
Chinese female freestyle swimmers
Olympic swimmers of China
Swimmers at the 1988 Summer Olympics
Asian Games medalists in swimming
Swimmers at the 1986 Asian Games
Swimmers at the 1990 Asian Games
Asian Games gold medalists for China
Asian Games silver medalists for China
Asian Games bronze medalists for China
Medalists at the 1986 Asian Games
Medalists at the 1990 Asian Games